The following list includes notable people who were born or have lived in Danville, Illinois. For a similar list organized alphabetically by last name, see the category page People from Danville, Illinois.

Arts and culture

Military

Politics

Space

Sports

References

 
Danville
Danville